Revelations: The White EP is the final of four EPs that make up Revelations, the fifth studio album by American group William Control.   The other three are The Pale, The Black and The Red, after the Four Horsemen of the Apocalypse.  It is also the final ever William Control release, after Control announced his retirement in October 2017.  The EP features appearances by Control Records artists Axel Otero of Lay Your Ghost and Lvci (on Bad Religion and The Sinner respectively), and also by Crilly Ashes on Bad Religion.

The White was released by Control Records on November 24, 2017 and peaked at 139 on the Billboard 200 chart (Control’s highest ever placing), and at number one on the Billboard Dance/Electronic Albums chart.  It also hit number one on the Heatseekers chart, an accomplishment achieved by all four of the Revelations EPs.

The only video was a lyric video for Ghost, released on November 13.

The EP was recorded at Control's Hell's Half Acre studio in and was produced and engineered by Kenneth Fletcher, and engineered and mixed by Axel Otero of the band Lay Your Ghost.  It was mastered by John Troxell.  Fans were invited down to the Control Merch shop to record gang vocals.

Track listing

Personnel
All credits adapted from liner notes.

 Kenneth Fletcher – producer, engineer, artwork, layout
 Axel Otero – engineer, mixing
 John Troxell – mastering

Charts

References

2017 EPs
William Control albums
Control Records albums
Synth-pop EPs
Dark wave EPs